Marina Lambraki-Plaka (c. 1939 – 13 June 2022) was a Greek historian, archaeologist, and academic.

Born in Greece.

She was the director of the National Gallery from 1992 to 2022.

She served as Alternate Minister of Culture in the Caretaker Cabinet of Vassiliki Thanou-Christophilou.

Publications
 Classical Memories in Modern Greek Art (Onassis Cultural Center, Olympic Tower / Alexander S. Onassis Public Benefit Foundation, 2000)
 Paris-Athenes 1863-1940 (with Olga Mentzafou-Polyzou; Pinacotheque Nationale et Musee Alexandros Soutzos, 2006)

References

1939 births
2022 deaths
Women historians
20th-century Greek historians
21st-century Greek historians
Culture ministers of Greece
Greek archaeologists
Greek women archaeologists
Greek women curators
People from Heraklion (regional unit)